Petrus Joannes Maria Dox (7 May 1898 – 26 November 1964) was a Belgian Flemish soldier during the First World War known for his opposition to the Belgian Army's French-speaking officers' discriminatory treatment of Flemish-speaking soldiers. His vocal criticism led to his dismissal from front line service and his reassignment to the woodchopping platoon of the Orne, a penal military unit.

After the war, Dox moved to the Belgian Congo where he served as a Christian missionary for the next few decades. He was killed during the Simba rebellion in November 1964.

Biography

World War I 

Around 1914, Dox joined the Dominican Order as a novice. In 1916, despite a Belgian royal decree that only men born before 1897 could be conscripted, he was drafted to fight in the First World War. As a member of the seminary, Dox had to serve in the medical corps, and after only a single month of training he was sent to the Western Front.

He was critical of the French-speaking officers' attitude towards Flemish-speaking soldiers, and wrote letters on the subject. This led to his demotion to a penal unit, the woodchopping platoon of the Orne, which he joined on 30 March 1918. The military's official conclusion read: "Doubts regarding his patriotism. Has expressed hostility toward national institutes in a letter sent from neutral territory." Dox was released eight months after the Armistice of 11 November 1918, on 10 July 1919.

One of his brothers, Ludovicus Gommarus, died in a German prisoner-of-war camp. His parents were also held captive by the German occupiers due to his father's participation in the resistance movement.

Missionary in Congo 
Dox took his religious vows in Ghent on 7 November 1924, and moved to the Belgian Congo on 18 December 1928, to work as a missionary for the next 36 years under his priest name, Valentinus.

He and his brother Frans, who was also a missionary, were killed in Watsa during the Simba rebellion on 26 November 1964. In total, 15 Belgian missionaries were killed. A square in their hometown of Lier was named after him and his brother.

See also 
 Flemish identity during World War I
 Language legislation in Belgium

References

Notes

Citations

Bibliography 

 
 
 

1898 births
1964 deaths
Belgian Dominicans
Belgian Army personnel of World War I
Belgian Roman Catholic missionaries
Dominican missionaries
Flemish Dominicans
Flemish people
People from Lier, Belgium
People murdered in the Democratic Republic of the Congo
Roman Catholic missionaries in the Democratic Republic of the Congo
Belgian Army soldiers
Belgian people murdered abroad
Male murder victims